is a Japanese manufacturer of hobby products such as the Nendoroid and figma product lines, as well as scale figures. In addition to production and manufacturing, its business includes design, marketing and distribution. Its products are usually based on anime, manga or video games that are currently popular in Japan, China and the United States, although the company also produces products based on other media properties such as the voice synthesizer software Vocaloid, VTubers and various western franchises such as Marvel Cinematic Universe and Masters of the Universe.

Outline 
Good Smile Company was established by Aki Takanori in 2001 as an event management and talent company. Thereafter it began working with Max Factory on hobby related products which soon become the main focus of the company. Good Smile Company is now primarily involved in the planning, production, manufacturing and sales of figures and toys, but also markets accessories and other goods.

Good Smile Company also acts as a distributor for a number of other hobby related companies including Max Factory, FREEing and Phat! Company. The company has a particularly long relationship with Max Factory, and often shares booths and display space with them at events such as Wonder Festival. As of June 2012, Good Smile Company moved from Matsudo, Chiba to the Tokyo Skytree's East Tower, which has become the joint headquarters for them and Max Factory.

'Kahotan's Blog' is a popular blog which introduces both Good Smile Company and related products to the public through the eyes of one of the female staff members. The blog is available in both English and Japanese.

Corporate history 
A summarized history of the company can be found below.

 May 2001 – Good Smile Company established in Matsudo, Chiba.
 January 2002 – Planning of toys, OEM production begins
 September 2004 – First Good Smile Company branded figure is released.
 April 2005 – Distribution of hobby related products begins
 February 2006 – Start of the Nendoroid series.
 January 2008 – Start of the figma series.
 2010
 March – Work begins on the Black Rock Shooter series.
 August – The Good Smile Cafe is opened.
 2012
 May – Changed from a Yūgen Gaisha to a Kabushiki Gaisha.
 July – Moved to the Tokyo Skytree East Tower.

Primary products 
Good Smile Company sells a variety of products with a focus on PVC character figurines. Most products are based on anime, manga or video game characters that are popular within Japan. They have products based on American movies and comics popular in the West such as Star Wars and characters from Marvel Comics. Popular series included in companies product line-up include Hatsune Miku, Black Rock Shooter products, Puella Magi Madoka Magica products, as well as characters from Nintendo games. They are most well known for:

 The Nendoroid figure series.
 The articulated figma figure series (with planning and development by Max Factory).
 Scale Figures

Related anime productions 
Good Smile Company has been involved in the following productions as a member of the production committee.
 Penguin Musume (2008)
 CANAAN (2009)
 Demon King Daimao (2010)
 Tantei Opera Milky Holmes Series (2010、2012)
 Dog Days Series (2011、2012)
 Hanasaku Iroha (2011)
 Croisée in a Foreign Labyrinth (2011)
 Haganai: I Don't Have Many Friends Series (2011、2013)
 The Legend of Heroes: Trails in the Sky OVA (2011)
 Plastic Nee-san (2011 - 2012)
 Black Rock Shooter (Noitamina Version、2012)
 Senki Zesshō Symphogear (2012)
 Berserk: The Golden Age Arc (2012)
 Tari Tari (2012)
 Wooser's Hand-to-Mouth Life (2012)
 Da Capo III (2013)
 Senyū (2013)
 Gargantia on the Verdurous Planet (2013)
 Aiura (2013)
 Saekano: How to Raise a Boring Girlfriend (2015)
 One Punch Man (2015)

Additionally, they were involved in the production and distribution of the Black Rock Shooter film (2010).

 Motorsports 

In 2008, Good Smile Company became the primary sponsor of Studie GLAD Racing, a team which took part in the GT300 race division of the Super GT racing series in a car featuring illustrations of Hatsune Miku. In 2010, a new subsidiary company called Good Smile Racing (GSR) was established which became the new racing team owner. Good Smile Racing also produces model cars and related goods to support the racing team with sponsors.

After a long struggle in the debut seasons, the team would taste their first success in 2011 season, by winning three out of eight races and take their first driver's championship title in GT300 class. They would later win another two GT300 drivers Championship in 2014 and 2017 season, being one of the most successful Super GT teams in series' history.

In 2017, they also made their international GT debut, becoming the first Japanese GT3 team participating in the Spa 24 Hours of Intercontinental GT Challenge.

In 2019 Spa 24 Hours, they partnered with Type-Moon (as Type-Moon Racing), TRIGGER, and Black Falcon to field three Mercedes-AMG GT GT3 cars with Hatsune Miku, Fate, and Promare liveries. The Promare'' car started from pole position and finished 3rd overall and the Hatsune Miku car also finished 3rd in the Silver Cup class, becoming the first itasha team to reach podium in international GT racing.

In 2022, Goodsmile Racing marked its entrance in the United States with the Goodsmile Racing Lamborghini Murciélago driven by Ace Ochoco. The Murciélago GT1 race car was unveiled at Anime Expo 2022 at the Los Angeles Convention Center.

Anime production business 
In recent years, the company played a large part in bringing together four smaller animation companies (Sanzigen, Trigger, Ordet and LIDEN FILMS) and pooling their talent together as a new holding company named ULTRA SUPER PICTURES. This business is a part of the animation production industry, but focuses not only on the production and development of high quality animation projects, but also the licensing of works, general management and training of new staff in order to create content aimed at a worldwide audience.

Associated companies 
 Max Factory
 Phat! Company
 Good Smile Racing
 Good Smile Logistics & Solutions
 native
 Gift
 MAGES.
 MEM
 Good Smile Shanghai
 HiTUBE
 Ultra Super Pictures
 Orange Rouge

External links 

 Official United States Website 
 Official English Website
 Official Nendoroid Website - English Version 
 Official figma Website (Japanese)
 Official Max Factory Website (Japanese) 
 Official Company Blog 'Mikatan Blog' - English Version
 Good Smile Racing
 ULTRA SUPER PICTURES (Japanese)
 Official English Facebook Page
 Official French Facebook Page
Official United States Twitter Account

References 

Manufacturing companies based in Tokyo
Toy companies of Japan
Toy companies established in 2001
Japanese companies established in 2001